Saint-Urbain is a commune in the Finistère department of Brittany in north-western France.

Population
Inhabitants of Saint-Urbain are called in French Saint-Urbannais.

See also
Communes of the Finistère department
List of the works of the Maître de Plougastel
Roland Doré sculptor Sculptor of Saint Urbain Calvary

References

External links

Official website 

Mayors of Finistère Association 

Communes of Finistère